The Hungarian Rifle Company of the Lithuanian Grand Hetman was a military unit of the Grand Duchy of Lithuania.

History 
The company was formed in 1717. The rifle company's chef was the Grand Hetman of Lithuania and the unit was always present wherever he was. It was disbanded in 1793.

Commanders

Bibliography

Citations

References 

Grand Duchy of Lithuania
Military units and formations established in 1717